Rispana River (also Rispana Rao) is a tributary of the Song River that drains central Dehradun in Uttarakhand, India. It emerges from a small spring at the base of Mussoorie ridge near Rajpur village. Currently, the river is contaminated as many of the city's sewage lines empty into the river and it has been encroached upon in many places. In 2018, a plan was initiated to revive Rispana, along with Bindal River.

References

Rivers of Uttarakhand
Geography of Dehradun
Dehradun district
Rivers of India